Afsnee is a village in the Belgian province of East Flanders. It is part of the urban area of the province's capital city Ghent.

It is situated at the banks of the river Lys.

Maurice and Anna De Weert bought a farm at Afsnee in 1895 beside the Lys which had belonged to a Dominican Monastery. Anna would paint there.

References

Sub-municipalities of Ghent
Populated places in East Flanders